Exochochromis anagenys, the threespot torpedo, is a species of haplochromine cichlid endemic to Lake Malawi in East Africa where it has been found around Thumbi West Island and in the southeastern part of the lake. It is also found in the aquarium trade. This species reaches a length of  SL. It is currently the only known member of its genus.

References

Haplochromini
Fish of Lake Malawi
Monotypic fish genera
threespot torpedo
Taxonomy articles created by Polbot